Prakadanam is a 1980 Indian Malayalam-language film,  directed by J. Sasikumar. The film stars Prathapachandran, Balan K. Nair, M. G. Soman and Ravikumar. The film's score was composed by G. Devarajan.

Cast
Prathapachandran as Kattukallan
Balan K. Nair as Chackochan
M. G. Soman as Jose
Ravikumar as Devan
Seema as Preethi
Jose Prakash as Damodharan
T. R. Omana as Preethi's mother
Sathaar as Gopalan
Prameela as Ammu
Pala Thankam as Hotel Warden
Kuthiravattom Pappu as Kamalahasanan
Bahadoor as Master
Meena as Gopalan's mother
Thodupuzha Radhakrishnan as Naanu

Soundtrack
The music was composed by G. Devarajan with lyrics by Poovachal Khader.

References

External links
 

1980 films
1980s Malayalam-language films
Films directed by J. Sasikumar